Heroes in Training is an anthology of fantasy stories, edited by Martin H. Greenberg and Jim C. Hines. It was first published in paperback by DAW Books in September 2007.

The book collects thirteen short stories and novelettes by various fantasy authors, with an introduction by Hines. It "follows the transformation of ordinary people into extraordinary heroes, including a shape-shifter who is forced unexpectedly into her first solo mission."

Contents
Introduction (Jim C. Hines)
"Roomies" (Esther Friesner)
"Three Names of the Hidden God" (Vera Nazarian)
"The Princess, the Page, and the Master Cook's Son" (Sherwood Smith)
"The Children's Crusade" (Robin Wayne Bailey)
"The Apprentice" (Catherine H. Shaffer)
"Beneath the Skin" (James Lowder)
"Giantkiller" (G. Scott Huggins)
"Drinker" (Michael Jasper)
"King Harrowhelm" (Ed Greenwood)
"Honor is a Game Mortals Play" (Eugie Foster)
"The Wizard's Legacy" (Michael A. Burstein)
"A Touch of Blue: a Web Shifters Story" (Julie Czerneda)
"Sir Apropos of Nothing and The Adventure of the Receding Heir" (Peter David)
"About the Authors"

Notes

2007 books
Martin H. Greenberg anthologies
Fantasy anthologies